A jester is a person who entertains using varied skills. These may include one or more of skills such as music, storytelling, juggling, acrobatics, joke telling and other similar skills. There have been many examples of jesters in history, fiction, and other mediums.

In history
 Archibald Armstrong (died 1672), jester of James VI
 Raja Birbal (c. 16th century), Indian jester of Emperor Akbar of Mughal Empire
 Jesse Bogdonoff (b. 1955), court jester and financial advisor of Taufa'ahau Tupou IV
 Chicot (c. 1540–1591), jester of Henry III of France
 Joan d'Acosta (c. 1665– c. 1740), jester of Peter the Great
 Tom Durie, jester of Anne of Denmark (d. 1619).
 Roland the Farter, 12th Century jester of Henry II of England
 Lucretia the Tumbler, jester of Queen Mary I of England 
 Jane Foole (died after 1558), jester of Queens Catherine Parr and Mary I
 Maître Guillaume (employed in 1620 at the same time as Mathurine de Vallois)
 Tenali Ramakrishna (c. 16th century), Indian jester of Emperor Krishnadevaraya of Vijayanagara Empire
 Stańczyk (c. 1480–1560), Polish jester
 William Sommers (died 1560), jester of Henry VIII of England
 João de Sá Panasco (fl. 1524-1567), jester of John III of Portugal
 John Pace (c.1523–c.1590), jester of the Duke of Norfolk and queen Elizabeth I of England
 Triboulet (1479–1536), jester of kings Louis XII and Francis I of France
 Madame d'Or, (d. after 1429), was a French court dwarf jester
 Mathurine de Vallois a.k.a. Mathurine la Folle (Mathurine the Fool), late 1500s to early 1600s, jestress to Henry IV of France and others, helped catch would-be assassin Jean Châtel
 Nichola, jester to Mary, Queen of Scots in the 1560s
 Jeffrey Hudson (1619–c. 1682), "court dwarf" of Henrietta Maria of France
 Jamie Fleeman (1713–1778), the Laird of Udny's Fool
 Perkeo of Heidelberg, 18th Century jester of Prince Charles III Philip, Elector Palatine
 Russel Erwood (b. 1981), 2nd official resident jester of Conwy in North Wales replacing the jester of 1295

In writing and theatre
In Shakespeare: see Shakespearian fool
Pocket, King Lear's fool in Christopher Moore's novel Fool, which retells the story of Shakespeare's King Lear.
Wamba, Jester in Sir Walter Scott's Novel Ivanhoe.
Dagonet, jester to King Arthur in medieval romances
Jack Point, tragic jester in The Yeomen of the Guard by Gilbert and Sullivan
Hop-Frog, in the eponymous short story by Edgar Allan Poe.
Towser, jester to King John the Presbyter in Memory, Sorrow, and Thorn by Tad Williams
Mr Harley Quin, in the Agatha Christie collection The Mysterious Mr Quin is a modernised version of the "wise fool" who helps others see the truth.
The anarchic Jerry Cornelius, often shown as a jester figure.
The Jester, 2003 novel by James Patterson and Andrew Gross.
The Fool, court jester in Robin Hobb's The Realm of the Elderlings books.
The Queen's Fool, novel by Philippa Gregory, centers around the life of a young "holy fool" named Hannah, who happens to work with and befriend William Sommers (Will), the former fool/jester of King Henry VIII.
The Jester is a central character in many of the plays of Dario Fo.
Rigoletto, Duke of Mantua's jester in Giuseppe Verdi's opera Rigoletto
"Bear", Jester on Crispin: Cross of Lead
Till Eulenspiegel, impudent trickster figure originating in Middle Low German folklore.
Heartless, novel by Marissa Meyer has a character Jest who is a fool/jester and magician in Wonderland, the Rook of Chess.

In film and television 
Clopin, mischievous leader of the gypsies who will defend his people at all costs in the film The Hunchback of Notre Dame (1996 film). He introduces the audience as a jester to the story, explaining how Quasimodo, the bell ringer from Notre Dame, got to be there. Michael Surrey served as the supervising animator for Clopin.
Giacomo "King of Jesters, and Jester of Kings" was a famous traveling jester in the 1956 film musical The Court Jester. His character was actually incapacitated early in the plot, and is never heard from again, but a member of an underground group, Hubert Hawkins, played by Danny Kaye, assumes Giacomo's identity in order to get into the King's castle.
Timothy Claypole, character in the BBC children's television comedy programme Rentaghost of the 1970s/80s, was a jester (played by Michael Staniforth).
The Photojournalist from Apocalypse Now is often seen as a harlequin figure. In the novel Heart of Darkness the character of Marlowe meets a Russian wanderer whose clothes have been made from patches of various garments sewn together, giving him the appearance of a harlequin. The Russian has developed a fanatic admiration for Kurtz. In the film actor Dennis Hopper portrays this fanaticism as being mixed with the 1960s counter-culture spirit of the Vietnam era.
Funnyman, A UK horror movie about a demonic jester, The Funny Man, with a varied and imaginative repertoire of homicidal techniques and an irreverent sense of humour.
Jester, Court jester of King Cradock in the TV series Jane and the Dragon.
Jester, the Harlequin puppet in the Puppet Master films
In the children's adventure game show Knightmare there were two jesters, Folly and Motley.
Kyoami, in Akira Kurosawa's film Ran

In comic books and animation 
In the Marvel Comics comic Daredevil, The Jester is the alter-ego of villain Jonathan Powers, who appears between issues #47 and 49.
The Jester is a superhero in the DC Comics universe.
QuackerJack, a vicious jester with a weird obsession for toys in Disney's animated series Darkwing Duck.
In the Disney animated film The Hunchback of Notre Dame, the narrator, and rather fundamental character, was Clopin, a jester.
Merryman, leader of the Inferior Five in DC Comics, wears a jester costume.
Maytag, in the webcomic Flipside is a jester. She is normally very timid, but takes on the normal jester stereotype when she wears her cap 'n bells.
Allen Walker, in the manga and anime D.Gray-man, is given the title Crown Clown, also known as God's Clown, and carries a jester's mask.
The DC Comics villain Harley Quinn derives her name and look from a harlequin jester. To a lesser extent, her boss, the Joker was based on a Jester from a Joker playing card.
Squidly, a squid jester from SpongeBob SquarePants, is found in the episode "Dunces and Dragons".
Spinel, a gem from Steven Universe: The Movie and Steven Universe Future. She was abandoned by Pink Diamond and left in the garden they used to play in for 6,000 years, causing her to break down and become insane when she found out about Pink Diamond's fate. Her bouncy animations are heavily sourced from rubber hose animation.
Fizzarolli, a club jester from Helluva Boss. He works for Asmodeus, owner of the popular club Ozzie’s, in the Lust Ring of Hell.
Jester Brothers, from The Glo Friends is a pair of pink fire ants who often gets in trouble by their own jokes.

In video games 
Marx – jester from Kirby Super Star and Kirby Super Star Ultra.
Jester is a character class in the MMORPG Flyff and in the RPGs Gauntlet: Dark Legacy and Darkest Dungeon.
Malcolm – mad jester of The Legend of Kyrandia adventure games
Fargus – in the platform game Pandemonium.
Harle – character in Chrono Cross who jests at expense of reality itself.
Dhoulmagus – evil jester in the Dragon Quest VIII game by Square Enix.
Dragon Quest III – contains a Jester character class. In the American version of the game, the character class is renamed to Goof-off.
Hecklar – insane and sadistic court jester in Kronos Digital's fighting game Cardinal Syn.
A nameless jester helps and hinders the player in the Infocom game Zork Zero.
Jester – an alter-ego of Arkham, in Devil May Cry 3.
Nights into Dreams... – featured two brightly colored jesters. Nights, who wore a purple jester outfit with a purple hat, each with carnival and dream like designs on them, and Reala, Nights' nemesis, who had a clownlike face, and wore red and sky blue, and red and black striped shoes with a red- and black-striped jester hat.
Cleon – is star fairy jester in Bust-a-Move 4.
Kefka Palazzo – in Final Fantasy VI, wears typical outfit and makeup of a jester.
Zorn & Thorn – pair of court jesters in the RPG Final Fantasy IX.
Dimentio – evil megalomaniac magician in Super Paper Mario who wears a stylized jester costume and creates clever similes. He is one of the main villains of the game and attempts to make Mario and Luigi his slaves. He also wears an Italian Comedy Mask.
There is also a Jester in the tower in the 2007 Xbox 360 game Overlord. The player can kick the jester, knocking him a great distance, making cow bell sounds when he hits the floor. The Jester also follows the player around the tower, and in the tutorial he taunts the player. The player must repeatedly hurt the jester to finish the tutorial.
In the two Persona 2 video games, Joker wears clothing reminiscent of that of a jester.
Jester – A.K.A. Sarah Hawkins in the game UT3, fitting her name by making jests about the opponent or teammates.
Twinkle – she a little jester girl tail in Bust a Move 3 
Umlaut – petrified Jester Skull in CarnEvil who gives a brief rhyme to describe what's in store upon selecting a level. He is also a sub-boss at the final level of the game.
Trivet – royal jester in the adventure game Blazing Dragons
Chuckles – jester in the Ultima series of role playing games, provides comic entertainment and plot hints.
Jollo – court jester of the Land of the Green Isles in King's Quest VI, is an essential ally to Alexander. He warns Alexander about Alhazred's genie and keeps him informed of the Vizer's scheming. In the long path of the game, he also is able to swap out the genie's lamp and get Alexander out of the dungeon once.
Tony Hawk's Underground 2 features "The Jester" as a playable character after the level in New Orleans.
 Shaco – evil jester of demonic origin, a playable trap champion in the game League of Legends.
Cicero – keeper from the Dark Brotherhood in The Elder Scrolls V: Skyrim, wears a jester's outfit and took on the persona of a jester after killing one.
Feste – jester for the Duke's court in Dragon's Dogma.
Laughlyn – powerful spirit in Shadowrun RPG. He is a trickster spirit of technology in decay. Jake must bend Laughlyn to his will in order to defeat the dragon, Drake. Laughlyn however has other ideas...
Jevil - A secret boss in the video game Deltarune. He was once the court jester of Card Castle, until he began to see the world as a game, and got locked in a prison cell under the castle by his friend Seam, as ordered by the king.
Joka - Joka, also known as "Joker", is a recurring character in the game series Klonoa.
Clownpiece - a fairy jester who lives on the moon and serves as one of the many bosses in Touhou Project. She first appeared in Legacy of Lunatic Kingdom. Her clothing is similar to the American flag, and she carries a torch that drives anyone mad upon looking at the flame within it.
Daycare Attendant - an animatronic jester found in the Superstar Daycare in Freddy Fazbear’s Mega Pizzaplex in Five Nights at Freddy’s Security Breach. He has two different personalities depending on whether the lights are on or off - Sun, who’s cheerful and energetic, and Moon, who’s sadistic and demented. Surprisingly, both personalities carry on the Daycare Attendant’s propensity for cleaning and following the rules.
Vex - primary antagonist in Sackboy: A Big Adventure, is a jester like creature made of cloth and born from chaos and fear, who wishes to plunge Craftworld into terror and despair through a nightmarish force called the Uproar.
Jester Zombie - a zombie jester from Plants vs. Zombies 2's Dark Ages, where they deflect physical projectiles from plants, such as peas, plasma balls, cabbage, etc.
Fiddle - a jester character who assists the player in Juilliard Music Adventure.

See also 
Buffoon
Clown
List of clowns
Shakespearean fool
Wise fool

References